Black Pride in the United States is a movement which encourages black people to celebrate African-American culture and embrace their African heritage. In the United States, it was a direct response to white racism especially during the Civil Rights Movement. Stemming from the idea of Black Power, this movement emphasizes racial pride, economic empowerment, and the creation of political and cultural institutions. Related movements include black power, black nationalism, Black Panthers and Afrocentrism.

Arts and music
Black pride is a major theme in some works by African American popular musicians. Civil Rights Movement era songs such as The Impressions's hit songs "We're a Winner" and "Keep on Pushing" and James Brown's "Say It Loud – I'm Black and I'm Proud" celebrated black pride. Beyoncé's half-time performance at Super Bowl 50, which included homages to Malcolm X and the Black Panthers, has been described by the media as a display of black pride.

Dating back to the 1960's, there was a push for people of color to be heard. Artists, like James Brown, won over the respect of the United States through their art and music. Creating movements like "Black is Beautiful," a movement where the features of black women were highlighted in picture form, allowed black people to emphasize their beauty and further emphasize the idea of Black Pride.

Beauty and fashion
Beauty standards are a major theme of black pride. Black pride was represented in slogans such as "black is beautiful" which challenged white beauty standards. Prior to the black pride movement, the majority of black people straightened their hair or wore wigs. The return to natural hair styles such as the afro, cornrows, and dreadlocks were seen as expressions of black pride.

In the 1960s to 1970s, kente cloth and the Black Panthers uniform were worn in the U.S. as expressions of black pride. Headscarves were sometimes worn by Nation of Islam and other Black Muslim Movement members as an expression of black pride and a symbol of faith. Other women used scarves with African prints to cover their hair.

Maxine Leeds Craig argues that all-black beauty pageants such as Miss Black America were institutionalized forms of black pride created in response to exclusion from white beauty pageants.

International

Brazil
The black pride movement is very popular in Brazil, especially among poorer members of the country's population, and it is found in the Brazilian funk music genre which arose in the late 1960s, as well as in funk carioca, which emerged in the late 1980s. The origin of Brazilian funk and the origin of funk carioca both reflect Brazilian black resistance. Ethnomusicologist George Yúdice states that youths who embraced a black culture which was being mediated by a U.S. culture industry were met with many arguments against their susceptibility to cultural colonization. Although it borrows some ingredients from hip hop, its style still remains unique to Brazil (mainly Rio de Janeiro and São Paulo).

Jamaica
Black pride has been a central theme of the originally Jamaican Rastafari movement since the second half of the 20th century. It has been described as "a rock in the face of expressions of white superiority."

United States
In the United States, African Americans have used the slogan to celebrate their heritage and personal pride. The black pride movement is closely linked to the history of the civil rights and Black Power movements which opposed the conditions which existed in the United States' segregated society, and lobbied for better treatment of members of all races.

See also
Black Arts Movement

Afrocentrism

References

Further reading

African-American culture
Black Power
Identity politics
Politics and race
Pride
Anti-racism in the United States